Kainaz Motivala is an Indian actress who has appeared in Hindi films. Her acting career started with a small role in Wake Up Sid as Tanya in 2009. She was signed for the role Shailey in the 2010 Bollywood film Paathshala.

In 2011, she performed as the lead female character for the horror-thriller film Ragini MMS. She has also appeared in few Indian television commercials like Uninor, McDonald's, Videocon Mobile Phone and Sony Pix Promo. Motivala has been trained by Shiamak Davar for six years.

Her mother tongue is Gujarati.

Personal life 
Kainaz married Urvaksh Doctor in a Parsi ceremony on 28 November 2013. A daughter was born to them in 2016.

Filmography

Television

References

External links 

 
 

Living people
21st-century Indian actresses
Actresses from Mumbai
Parsi people from Mumbai
Actresses in Hindi television
Actresses in Hindi cinema
Indian film actresses
Year of birth missing (living people)